Holy Trinity Greek Orthodox Church is a Greek Orthodox Church in Wilmington, Delaware. Established in 1934, the church is an important part of the Greek community in Wilmington. The church complex also contains a Greek community center, and is the site of the church's annual Greek festival.

References 

Churches in Wilmington, Delaware
Greek Orthodox churches in the United States
1934 establishments in Delaware
Churches completed in 1934